Psychrophrynella usurpator is a species of frogs in the family Strabomantidae. It is endemic to Peru and known from near Abra Acjanacu (its type locality), a mountain pass in the Cordillera de Paucartambo, the easternmost Andean range towards the Amazonian lowlands, and from the high elevation grasslands of the Manu National Park. It is named usurpator because these frogs were previously misidentified as Noblella peruviana—in a sense, they had "usurped" the name of another frog species.

Description
Psychrophrynella usurpator is a moderately robust-bodied frog with moderately long legs, without tympanic membrane but with a tympanic annulus that is visible through the skin, and rounded snout. Males measure  and females  in snout–vent length. Dorsum is gray to brown with smooth skin.

Males have vocal sacs and slits and call in mid-afternoon. The call is a series of short, quickly repeated, moderately high notes

Habitat and conservation
They can be found within bunch grasses, under mosses, and under rocks in humid puna. This species is common in the Manú National Park and in suitable habitats outside of the park. Burning of grasslands and agricultural activities can cause habitat loss outside the park but are not believed to cause population declines. The species seems also insensitive to chytridiomycosis.

References

usurpator
Frogs of South America
Endemic fauna of Peru
Amphibians of Peru
Amphibians of the Andes
Amphibians described in 2008